Jack Watson may refer to:

Jack Watson (actor) (1915–1999), English actor
Jack Watson (American football) (1893–1963), American football player and coach
Jack Watson (Australian footballer) (1927–2013), Australian rules footballer
Jack Watson (British Army officer) (1917–2011)
Jack Watson (cattle station manager) (1852−1896)
Jack Watson (cricketer) (1921–2012), English cricketer
Jack Watson (footballer, born 1892) (1892–1957), English football defender for Birmingham
Jack Watson (presidential adviser) (born 1938), White House Chief of Staff to President Jimmy Carter
Jack Watson (Scottish footballer) (1911–1944)
Jack C. Watson (1928–2022), American jurist, Justice of the Louisiana Supreme Court
John Fox Watson (1917–1976), Scottish footballer, nicknamed Jack

See also
John Watson (disambiguation)